A Sunday in the Country is a 1984 French drama film directed, co-written, and co-produced by Bertrand Tavernier, based on Pierre Bost's 1945 novel Monsieur Ladmiral va bientôt mourir. The film stars Louis Ducreux, Michel Aumont, Sabine Azéma, Geneviève Mnich, and Monique Chaumette. It explores family dynamics in a clan on the eve of World War I.

The film was theatrically released in France on 11 April 1984, and was selected to compete for the Palme d'Or in the main competition section at the 37th Cannes Film Festival, where Tavernier was awarded Best Director. It received generally positive reviews from critics. The film won Best Actress for Azéma, Best Adapted Screenplay, and Best Cinematography from a total of eight nominations, including Best Film, at the 10th César Awards. It was nominated for Best Foreign Language Film at the 42nd Golden Globe Awards and the 38th British Academy Film Awards.

Plot

The story takes place during a Sunday in the late summer of 1912. Monsieur Ladmiral is a painter without any real genius and in the twilight of his life. Since the death of his wife, he lives alone with Mercedes, his servant. As every Sunday, he invites Gonzague, his son, a steady young man, who likes order and propriety, accompanied by his wife, Marie-Thérèse and their three children, Emile, Lucien and Mireille. That day, Irène, Gonzague's sister, a young  non-conformist, liberated and energetic woman, upsets this peaceful ritual and calls into question her father's artistic choices.

Cast
 Louis Ducreux as Monsieur Ladmiral
 Michel Aumont as Gonzague
 Sabine Azéma as Irène
 Geneviève Mnich as Marie-Thérèse
 Monique Chaumette as Mercédès
 Thomas Duval as Emile
 Quentin Ogier as Lucien
 Katia Wostrikoff as Mireille
 Claude Winter as Madame Ladmiral
 Jean-Roger Milo as Fisherman (Le pêcheur)
 Pascale Vignal as A servant (La serveuse)
 Jacques Poitrenaud as Hector (Patron guinguette)
 Valentine Suard as Little girl (La petite fille 1)
 Erika Faivre as Little girl (La petite fille 2)
 Marc Perrone as Accordionist (L'accordéoniste)

Reception

Critical response
On the review aggregator website Rotten Tomatoes, the film has an approval rating of 100% based on 7 reviews, with an average rating of 8.4/10. Janet Maslin of The New York Times wrote that "A Sunday in the Country is exquisite - purposefully and almost painfully so - from beginning to end" and stated it "is one of the director's very best films, acted as beautifully and thoughtfully as it is staged." Paul Attanasio of The Washington Post described it as "a glistening, ornately constructed movie in which everything's of a piece" and said that "what's extraordinary about A Sunday in the Country is the way Tavernier, with a few strokes, limns nuanced, authentic characters." Sheila Benson of the Los Angeles Times called the film "moving and masterly" and commented that "a felicity and intelligence infuse every particle of the film, its clothes, its art direction, editing, photography and music. The actors are superb." Roger Ebert gave the film 4 out of 4 stars, feeling Tavernier's story was "graceful and delicate" and wrote that "A Sunday in the Country has a haunting, sweet, sad quality. It is about this family, and many families. It is told by Tavernier with great attention to detail, and the details add up to the way life is."

Accolades

Music
The sound track features excerpts from Gabriel Fauré's Piano Quartet No. 2 in C minor, Op. 115.

References

External links
 

1984 films
1984 drama films
1980s French films
1980s French-language films
1980s historical drama films
French historical drama films
Films about families
Films about father–daughter relationships
Films about father–son relationships
Films about fictional painters
Films about old age
Films based on French novels
Films directed by Bertrand Tavernier
Films featuring a Best Actress César Award-winning performance
Films produced by Alain Sarde
Films set in 1912
Films shot in Val-d'Oise